Dolly Parton's Coat of Many Colors is a 2015 American made-for-television drama film based on a true story by Dolly Parton, written by Pamela K. Long and directed by Stephen Herek. The film premiered on NBC on December 10, 2015. The film received generally positive reviews from critics.

Plot
Coat of Many Colors details Dolly Parton's upbringing in 1955 as her family struggles to live in Tennessee's Great Smoky Mountains, putting a strain on love and faith. Dolly (Alyvia Alyn Lind) aspires to be something greater but must cope with family troubles, including the premature birth and death of a baby brother. Dolly's mother, Avie Lee Parton (Jennifer Nettles) uses the baby's blanket to make Dolly her patchwork coat of many colors. Although Dolly is at first proud of it, she changes her mind after school bullies make fun of her. Meanwhile, Dolly's father, Lee Parton (Ricky Schroder) suffers a personal crisis brought about by the baby's death combined with the depression of his wife and a drought which threatened his tobacco crop. Eventually, faith brings the family together again.

Cast
 Alyvia Alyn Lind as Dolly Parton, a precocious nine-year-old who hopes to be a famous singer
 Jennifer Nettles as Avie Lee Parton, the devout matriarch of the Partons living in the mountains
 Ricky Schroder as Robert Lee Parton, the hard-working patriarch of the Partons with faith issues
 Gerald McRaney as Rev. Jake Owens, Avie Lee's father and preacher 
 Carson Meyer as Willadeene Parton, Dolly's oldest sister
 Hannah Nordberg as Judy Ogle, Dolly's schoolmate-turned-friend
 Mary Lane Haskell as Miss Moody, school teacher who is firm yet supportive of Dolly's aspiration
 Stella Parton as Corla Bass, owner of the town market and a gossip
 Forrest Deal as Rudy Sanders, a school bully
 Kennedy Brice as Gloria Sanders, Rudy's sister and another bully
 Farrah Mackenzie as Stella Parton, Dolly's younger sister
 Parker Sack as David Parton, Dolly's oldest brother
 Dylan Rowen as Denver Parton, Dolly's second-oldest brother
 Blane Crockarell as Bobby Parton, Dolly's younger brother
 Jennifer D. Taylor as Aunt Dorothy Jo
 Dolly Parton as the narrator
Christopher Ryan Lewis as Claude Sanders, Rudy and Gloria's brother

Production

Filming
Coat of Many Colors was filmed in Covington and Conyers, Georgia, and Sevier County, Tennessee, the latter at Dollywood for introductory and closing scenes from Dolly Parton.

Casting
Parton, whose childhood is told in the film's story written by her, is also executive producer. She spoke about the casting process, beginning with singer Jennifer Nettles, who plays her mother: "When she started reading I thought, Oh my lord, that's momma. And, she is incredible ... I didn't even know she acted." For her father, Parton already had someone in mind, Ricky Schroder, because "he reminds me so much of my daddy." In casting the younger Dolly, several hundred children auditioned. Parton stated "God's going to send her." Alyvia Alyn Lind auditioned and could "sing...act" and "cry on cue", said Parton, adding, "When she came in, it just kind of blew it all out of the water and she got the part."  In addition, Dolly's younger sister Stella Parton appears in the film, playing town gossip Corla Bass.

Reception

Critical reception
Coat of Many Colors received favorable reviews from critics. On Rotten Tomatoes, it has received a 78% rating from nine critics. Among eight reviews at Metacritic, it holds a "generally favorable" score of 65 out of 100.

Ken Tucker of Yahoo TV gave the film its highest praise, stating "The pastoral nostalgia that this TV-movie taps into is powerful, if maudlin, stuff. This is the time of year when sentimentality can be a warming thing, and Parton's Coat  will keep an awful lot of people warm this winter."

The Guardian Brian Moylan commented on the film's faith storyline: "For those who don’t regularly visit the house of the Lord, it will make your eyes roll like loose marbles in the back of a station wagon."

David Wiegand of the San Francisco Chronicle was the most critical but commented: "Although it's a struggle at times, you do suspend disbelief and go with it because Lind is so adorable, and you want to accept that the saccharine story line could have played out in real life just the way it's depicted in the film."

Ratings
In its initial December 10, 2015 broadcast, Coat of Many Colors was seen by 13.03 million viewers and received a 1.8/6 rating/share in the 18-49 age demographic. This marks the highest viewership for any television film (made for TV or theatrical) or miniseries on the broadcast networks since 2012.

Awards
On April 3, 2016, Coat of Many Colors was honored during the Academy of Country Music Awards ceremony with the Tex Ritter Award, which is presented to a film released in the previous year that features country music. Dolly Parton accepted the award. At the 6th Critics' Choice Television Awards, Alyvia Alyn Lind was nominated for Best Actress in a Limited Series or Television Movie.

Sequel

In May 2016, it was announced that a sequel to the film was in the works. In Dolly Parton's Christmas of Many Colors: Circle of Love, Jennifer Nettles, Ricky Schroder, Gerald McRaney and Alyvia Alyn Lind reprised their roles. Stephen Herek returned to direct the sequel written by Pamela K. Long. Dolly Parton herself also had a cameo. The film aired on NBC on November 30, 2016.

References

External links 
 
 

2015 television films
2015 films
2015 drama films
NBC network original films
Coat
Films about religion
Films set in the 1950s
Films directed by Stephen Herek
Films shot in Georgia (U.S. state)
Films shot in Tennessee
Films set in Tennessee
Films based on songs
Biographical films about singers
American drama television films
2010s American films